David Isberg (born 23 February 1975) is a Swedish musician who founded the Swedish progressive death metal band Opeth.  David Isberg is also known as DJ Dake, having a successful DJ career with independent and electronic music, often influenced by the Madchester, some obscurer 70's rock, and psychedelic music. He also DJs old school heavy, thrash, speed and death metal.

Opeth
Isberg formed Opeth with some friends from Täby in the Spring of 1990. Long-time friend Mikael Åkerfeldt was in a band called Eruption, but was considering a departure from this group. Isberg invited him to play bass for Opeth and Åkerfeldt accepted the offer. When he came to the rehearsal, however, none of the other members of the band knew Mikael was coming and they did not want to kick out the bass player they already had. The ensuing argument played out with all the members of Opeth (aside from David) leaving. They renamed themselves Crowley and released a demo tape called "The Gate" in 1991.

Isberg remained with Opeth until 1992. His duties as a lead singer were taken up by Åkerfeldt.

After Opeth
Isberg continued his musical career with electronic project Grooveza (later Grooveza/Fuzz), death metal band Mynjun, and experimental death metal band David Isberg & The Stockholm War Ensemble as well as Stockholm Death Metal band Tutorial together with Adam Skogvards of Mynjun.

By 2009, Isberg was active in at least two extreme metal bands Braathum and the restarted version of Mynjun named Tutorial and later somn.

bloodofjupiter

Since 2011 David renamed his band bloodofjupiter after his interest in astronomy and wine (the name refers to Tuscan grape Sangiovese in an astrophysical occult way of spelling putting the three words into one). The band released various rehearsal demos and a live recording (also to be released on cassette in 2019) on the internet. At Halloween 2020 the band will release their debut album "Eternal Damnation" recorded at Studio Humbucker in February and April 2020. The album has seven songs approx 56 minutes and is mixed and mastered by Robert Pehrsson.

References

Swedish heavy metal bass guitarists
Opeth members
1975 births
Living people
21st-century bass guitarists